SliTaz GNU/Linux is a lightweight Linux distribution, community-based, suitable for use on older hardware and as a Live CD or Live USB. SliTaz stands for "Simple, Light, Incredible, Temporary Autonomous Zone" according to the boot screen.

Features 
SliTaz uses the Openbox window manager.

Additional packages are added using a program called "TazPanel". This is due to the specific package format that SliTaz uses (tazpkg). It can still use packages from the more popular distribution though, as Debian, by means of first carrying out a conversion of these different packages.

By default, SliTaz offers no persistence, however it can still be added if the user wishes. The choice of the filesystem/bootloader used with slitaz is then of importance however; persistence being only available with ext2 and ext3 filesystems and the syslinux or extlinux boot loader.

Another useful tool is TazLiTo, with which users can create their own LiveCD based on selected packages or even based upon the current system state.

System requirements 
SliTaz GNU/Linux is supported on all machines based on the i486 or x86 Intel compatible processors. The Live CD has four variants of SliTaz, requiring from 192 MB of RAM for the Core system to 48 MB for a text mode and X Window System.

SliTaz can even run in 24 MB of RAM and a little swap memory. SliTaz can be booted from a Live CD, Live USB, floppy disk, or a local area network (PXE), or can be installed, requiring approximately 80 MB of hard disk space.

TazLiTo 
TazLito is the LiveCD creation utility in SliTaz GNU/Linux.

Common Operations

Check Root 
Check to ensure UID is zero (i.e., TazLito was run by root or root sudoer).

Check Root File System 
Looks for the existence of an etc. directory in the root file system directory. N.B., this does not do any further checking to ensure anything is actually in the directory. However, if TazLito is used for all LiveCD creation operations (that is, one does not create/modify the directories used by TazLito) the directories existence implies it is populated properly.

Verify Root CD 
Looks for the existence of a boot directory in the root CD directory. N.B., this does not do any further checking to ensure anything is actually in the directory. However, if TazLito is used for all LiveCD creation operations (that is, one does not create/modify the directories used by TazLito) the directories existence implies it is populated properly.

Generate initramfs 
 Executes scripts for packages altering the root file system
 Hard links redundant files in the root filesystem to save space
 Runs cpio to create the initramfs, compressing with lzma or gzip (or no compression)

Release history 

As with any Linux distribution, the route of development of SliTaz is mainly determined by the coders themselves. For SliTaz 5, some major changes seem to be the swapping of systemd by BusyBox's init and udev, hence avoiding safety risks, and more implementation of Qt. An implementation of x64 and ARM architectures are currently under development.

Reception 
Dedoimedo reviewed SliTaz GNU/Linux 1.0. and commented:

Dedoimedo also reviewed version 2.0.

DistroWatch published a review of SliTaz GNU/Linux 1.0:

A 2022 review of SliTaz 5.0 in Full Circle magazine concluded:

Gallery

See also 

 Comparison of Linux Live Distros
 Lightweight Linux distribution
 List of Linux distributions that run from RAM

References

External links 
 
 

Independent Linux distributions
Light-weight Linux distributions
Linux distributions
Linux distributions without systemd
Live USB
LiveDistro
Operating system distributions bootable from read-only media
Rolling Release Linux distributions